Wayne F. Pyne (December 24, 1917 – October 11, 2004) was a Canadian football player who played for the Saskatchewan Roughriders. He played junior football in Regina.

References

1917 births
2004 deaths
Players of Canadian football from Saskatchewan
Saskatchewan Roughriders players
Sportspeople from Regina, Saskatchewan